Comanche County USD 300, previously known as South Central USD 300, is a public unified school district headquartered in Coldwater, Kansas, United States.  The district includes the communities of Coldwater, Protection, Wilmore, Buttermilk, and nearby rural areas.

Schools

The school district operates the following schools:
 South Central High School in Coldwater. It also serves as the district headquarters.
 South Central Middle School and South Central Elementary School in Protection. The former Protection High School is one of the campus buildings.

History
In 1999, Wilmore, Protection, Coldwater consolidated into South Central USD 300.

Prior to 2013 the school issued full laptops for students to use, but that year it began issuing Chromebooks instead.

High school
In the fall students may pick cross country, tennis, in the high school also football, and volleyball. In the winter high school students play basketball, girls may join cheerleading teams. Spring sports include track and golf.

See also
 Kansas State Department of Education
 Kansas State High School Activities Association
 List of high schools in Kansas
 List of unified school districts in Kansas

References

External links
 

School districts in Kansas
Comanche County, Kansas
1999 establishments in Kansas
School districts established in 1999